Yaqub Ali Sharif is a politician of Patuakhali District of Bangladesh, physician and former member of parliament for the Patuakhali-2 constituency in February 1996.

Career 
Yaqub Ali Sharif was elected a member of parliament for Patuakhali-2 as a Bangladesh Nationalist Party candidate in the February 1996 Bangladeshi general election. He was an assistant professor in the Department of Radiology at PG Hospital and a professor at Sher-e-Bangla Medical College.

He established 'Dr. Yakub Sharif Degree College' in 1993 in Baga Union No.7 of Baufal Upazila in Patuakhali District.

References 

People from Patuakhali district
Bangladesh Nationalist Party politicians
6th Jatiya Sangsad members
Date of birth missing